Edward Baldwyn (1746–1817) was an English clergyman and pamphleteer.

Life
Baldwyn was educated at St John's College, Oxford (B.A., 1767; M.A., 1784). For some years he was resident in Yorkshire, master of Bradford Grammar School from 1784. Under the pseudonym of "Trim", he engaged in a literary squabble with the Rev. William Atkinson and other clergymen (John Crosse, and Atkinson's brother Johnson Atkinson Busfeild).

Subsequently, Balwyn moved to Ludlow in Shropshire, and eventually became rector of Abdon in the county.

He died in Kentish Town, London, 11 February 1817, and was buried in Old St Pancras churchyard.

Works
Baldwyn wrote:

 A Critique on the Poetical Essays of the Rev. William Atkinson, 1787.
 Further Remarks on two of the most Singular Characters of the Age, 1789.
 A Letter to the Author of Remarks on two of the most Singular Characters of the Age. By the Rev. John Crosse, vicar of Bradford; with a reply by the former, 1790, with which is printed The Olla Podrida; or Trim's Entertainment for his Creditors. 
 Remarks on the Oaths, Declarations, and Conduct of Johnson Atkinson Busfield, Esq., 1791.
 A Congratulatory Address to the Rev. John Crosse, on the Prospect of his Recovery from a Dangerous Disease, 1791.

References

Attribution

1746 births
1817 deaths
Alumni of St John's College, Oxford
19th-century English people
18th-century English non-fiction writers
18th-century English male writers
18th-century English writers
English non-fiction writers
18th-century English Anglican priests
English pamphleteers
English male non-fiction writers